This is a list of newspapers in Jordan.

Daily newspapers
Al Ra'ai, national
Ad-Dustour, national
Al Ghad, national
Ammon News, online newspaper
Jordan Times, English; national
Jordan News, English; national
 Saraya, online newspaper

Suspended dailies
Al Arab Al Yawm

Weekly newspapers
Al Ahali, leftist voice of the Popular Democratic Party in Jordan, not strictly party political but run on newspaper lines
Al Kalimah
Al Liwaa
Al Majd, pan-Arab nationalist
Al Watan, nationalistic slant
Asrar Newspaper
Assabeel, Islamic
Fact International, English and Arabic published every Wednesday
Hawadeth Al Saaeh
Shihan
The Star,  English weekly, independent, political, economic, social, published every Thursday

See also

List of newspapers

References

External links
 

 
Jordan
Newspapers